This article concerns the systems of telecommunications in Denmark. Denmark has a highly developed and efficient telephone network, and has a number of radio and television broadcast stations.

Infrastructure

The Denmark telecommunications network consists of buried and submarine cables and a microwave radio relay form trunk network, as well as four cellular radio communications systems.

There are 18 submarine fiber-optic cables linking Denmark with Norway, Sweden, Russia, Poland, Germany, the Netherlands, United Kingdom, Faroe Islands, Iceland, and Canada. There are also a number of satellite earth stations providing an international communications link - 6 Intelsat, 10 Eutelsat, 1 Orion, 1 Inmarsat (Blaavand-Atlantic-East). The Nordic countries share the Danish earth station and the Eik, Rogaland station for worldwide Inmarsat access.

Telephones
Denmark has an excellent telephone system network. There are 2.4 million (June 2006) main lines and 5.6 million (June 2006) mobile phones in use.

Internet

The country code top-level domain in Denmark is .dk.

As of 2004, there were 2,666,520 internet users in Denmark and 12 ISP providers.

Radio

There are two AM radio broadcast stations in Denmark, 355 FM stations, and one DAB station with 17 channels as of 2005.

See also

 Internet censorship in Denmark

References